Nebrarctia guttata is a moth of the family Erebidae. It was described by Nikolay Grigoryevich Erschoff in 1874. It is found in western Tien Shan, Hissar and eastern Afghanistan.

References

 

Spilosomina
Moths described in 1874